Elachista sasae is a moth in the family Elachistidae. It was described by Sinev and Sruoga in 1995. It is found in Japan (Hokkaidô, Honsyû) and the Russian Far East (Sakhalin).

The length of the forewings is 4–4.7 mm for males and 4.6–5.3 mm for females. The forewings are dark grey-brownish, mottled with light greyish bases of scales. There are three whitish spots. The hindwings are dark grey-brownish. Adults have been recorded on wing in early July and again in September.

The larvae feed on Sasa (including Sasa kurilensis) and Pleioblastus species. They mine the leaves of their host plant. The mine starts as a linear, straight or somewhat wavy gallery that extends towards the apex of the leaf. Later, the linear mine U-turns beyond a strong vein and extends towards the base in a similar way. Finally it broadens into a large blotch. Larvae can be found from late-July to mid-August and again from October to May.

References

Moths described in 1995
sasae
Moths of Japan
Moths of Asia